Cnipsomorpha is a genus of Asian stick insects in the tribe Medaurini, erected by Hennemann, Conle, Zhang and Liu in 2008.  Species have been recorded from: southern China (Guangxi and Yunnan) and Vietnam (yet to be described).

Species
The Phasmida Species File lists:
 Cnipsomorpha apteris (Liu & Cai, 1992)
 Cnipsomorpha bii Ho, 2017
 Cnipsomorpha colorantis (Chen & He, 1996)
 Cnipsomorpha daliensis Ho, 2017
 Cnipsomorpha erinacea Hennemann, Conle, Zhang & Liu, 2008 - type species
 Cnipsomorpha inflexa Ho, 2021
 Cnipsomorpha jinpingensis Ho, 2021
 Cnipsomorpha kunmingensis Chen & Pan, 2009
 Cnipsomorpha maoershanensis Ho, 2017
 Cnipsomorpha nigromaculata Ho, 2021
 Cnipsomorpha nigrospina Ho, 2021
 Cnipsomorpha polyspina Ho, 2021
 Cnipsomorpha serratitibia Ho, 2021
 Cnipsomorpha trituberculata Ho, 2021
 Cnipsomorpha viridis Ho, 2021

References

External links

Phasmatodea genera
Phasmatodea of Asia
Phasmatidae